The 122 engine was designed by Chevrolet and was used in a wide array of General Motors vehicles. The 122 was similar to the first two generations of the General Motors 60° V6 engine; sharing cylinder bore diameters and some parts . The 122 was available in the US beginning in 1982 for the GM J platform compact cars and S-series trucks.

For the J cars, it evolved through 2002 when it was replaced by GMs Ecotec line of DOHC 4-cylinder engines. In the S-10 related models, it evolved through 2003 and was known as the Vortec 2200. Production ceased consistent with the replacement of the S-series trucks with the GMT 355 sub-platform.

Generation I

1.8

L46
The 1.8 L pushrod engine was the first engine to power the J-Body cars. Introduced with the models in 1982, the 1.8 used a 2-barrel Rochester carburetor and produced  and 100 lb/ft of torque.

Applications:
1982 Buick Skyhawk
1982 Cadillac Cimarron
1982 Chevrolet Cavalier
1982 Oldsmobile Firenza
1982 Pontiac J2000

2.0

LQ5
A stroked version of the 1.8 L engine, displacing 2.0 L, was introduced midway through 1982, to provide more low-rpm power for the J cars. This engine replaced the 1.8 L engine altogether and had throttle-body fuel injection. It produces , and 110 lb/ft of torque. 

Applications:
1983–1986 Buick Skyhawk
1983–1986 Cadillac Cimarron
1983–1986 Chevrolet Cavalier
1983–1986 Oldsmobile Firenza
1983–1985 Pontiac J2000/2000/Sunbird

LQ2
This engine was similar to the LQ5 however it did not use throttle body fuel injection, instead it had a 2-barrel carburetor. This engine was used in the Chevrolet S-10 and GMC S-15 compact pickup trucks and their Blazer and Jimmy counterparts until 1985, when it was replaced by the 2.5 L Tech IV engine.

Applications:
1982–1985  Chevrolet S-10 and GMC S-15
1982–1985 Chevrolet S-10 Blazer and GMC S-15 Jimmy

Generation II

2.0

LL8
This engine replaced the LQ5 and was used from 1987 until 1989.

Applications:
1987–1989 Buick Skyhawk
1987–1989 Chevrolet Beretta
1987–1989 Chevrolet Cavalier
1987–1989 Chevrolet Corsica
1987–1988 Oldsmobile Firenza
1987–1989 Pontiac Tempest

2.2

LM3
For the 1990 model year, GM replaced the 2.0 L engine with a stroked version displacing 2.2 L and using throttle-body fuel injection (TBI).

Applications:
1990–1991 Chevrolet Beretta
1990–1991 Chevrolet Cavalier
1990–1991 Chevrolet Corsica
1990–1991 Pontiac Tempest

LN2
In the L-body cars it was converted straight to Sequential Fuel Injection. The MPFI and SFI versions produced enough power to allow the 2.2 to replace the old Pontiac Iron Duke engine as the 4-cylinder offering in the S/T platform trucks and A-body cars. For 1996, it became known as the Vortec 2200 in the S/T trucks.

For 1998, the engine was revised for emissions regulations and became known as the 2200. The engine was discontinued in 2003, replaced by the 2.2 L DOHC Ecotec engine. Although it displaces 134 cu. in, the 2.2 L OHV is still commonly referred to as the GM 122 today, and has been reputed for its simplicity, reliability and ease of maintenance in the J-body cars and S-Series trucks, and a few L-Body cars. The 2003 model LN2 is equipped with secondary air injection.

Applications:
1993–1996 Buick Century
1992–1996 Chevrolet Beretta
1992–2002 Chevrolet Cavalier
1992–1996 Chevrolet Corsica
1993 Chevrolet Lumina
1994–1997, 2003 Chevrolet S-10, GMC Sonoma and Isuzu Hombre
1993–1994 Grumman LLV
1993–1996 Oldsmobile Cutlass Ciera
1995–2002 Pontiac Sunfire

L43
The Vortec 2200 (RPO code L43) is an OHV straight-4 truck engine. This engine is equipped with secondary air injection, and is flex-fuel capable. It is entirely different from the Iron Duke, and was the last North American iteration of the GM 122 engine. The 2200 uses an iron block and aluminum 2-valve cylinder head. This engine was replaced by the LN2 in September 2002.

Applications:
1998–2002 Chevrolet S-10, GMC Sonoma and Isuzu Hombre

See also

 List of GM engines

References 

122
Straight-four engines
Gasoline engines by model